The crinoid shrimp, or feather star shrimp Hippolyte catagrapha, is a species of shrimp in the family Hippolytidae

Description

Crinoid shrimps grow to up to 3 cm in total length. They are well camouflaged shrimps which live on a host crinoid, the elegant feather star, Tropiometra carinata.

Distribution
These animals are found off the South African coast in False Bay and have been seen from 10 to at least 30 m underwater. They are probably endemic to this area. There is evidence however, that these shrimp exist elsewhere in the world with the species recently observed in the Philippines.

Ecology
These shrimps have so far only been seen in association with crinoids. They probably eat the wastes of their host.

References

Hippolytidae
Crustaceans described in 2007